Paolo Ferrari (26 February 1929 – 6 May 2018) was an Italian actor, voice actor and television presenter.

Biography
Ferrari was born in Brussels as his father was at the time the Italian consul in the Belgian Congo, and was in Belgium for a diplomatic mission. His mother, Giulietta, was a concert pianist. He made his acting debut at 9 years old, in Alessandro Blasetti's Ettore Fieramosca and he appeared in over 45 films between 1938 and 2018. He became first known as "the balilla Paolo", a character he played in numerous radio programs for children and teenagers during the fascist era. After the war he studied at the Silvio d’Amico Academy of Dramatic Arts.

Ferrari died in Rome on 6 May 2018, at the age of 89.

Selected filmography
 Kean (1940)
 Odessa in Flames (1942)
 Toto Seeks Peace (1954)
  Laugh! Laugh! Laugh! (1954)
 Susanna Whipped Cream (1957)
 Legs of Gold (1958)
 Le signore (1960)
 Akiko (1961)
 I Don Giovanni della Costa Azzurra (1962)
 White Voices (1964)
 Lo scippo (1965)
 Pronto... c'è una certa Giuliana per te (1967)
 A Man for Emmanuelle (1969)
 Once a Year, Every Year (1994)

References

External links

1929 births
2018 deaths
Italian male film actors
Italian male child actors
Italian male radio actors
Italian male voice actors
Italian television presenters
Male actors from Brussels
20th-century Italian male actors
Accademia Nazionale di Arte Drammatica Silvio D'Amico alumni